Christmas Mountain: The Story of a Cowboy Angel is a 1981 Western film about the true meaning of the Christmas spirit. Starring  Mark Miller of Savannah Smiles and Slim Pickens in one of his final roles, the film was originally produced and released in 1981. The original 16MM master was then lost for 20 years. Jack Evans, a partner and financier of the original film, eventually regained possession of the master. It was digitally remastered by Victory Studios of Los Angeles in 2008, and is now available on  DVD.

A review of the original release in The New York Times said, "This heartwarming Christmas tale contains a western twist as it tells the tale of a heavenly cowpoke who rides down to earth to ride herd on a few people in need of some miracles."

Cast
Mark Miller as Gabe Sweet
Slim Pickens as the cowboy angel
Barbara Stanger as Teresa

Production
Parts of the film were shot in Utah County and Salt Lake City, Utah.

See also
 List of Christmas films
 List of films about angels

References

External links
movie website
 

1981 films
1980s Christmas films
1981 Western (genre) films
American Christmas films
American Western (genre) films
Films shot in Utah
1980s English-language films
1980s American films
Films about angels